Popești is a commune located in Vrancea County, Romania. It is composed of two villages, Popești and Terchești. These were part of Urechești Commune until 2003, when they were split off.

References

Communes in Vrancea County
Localities in Muntenia